Milton Township may refer to:

 Milton Township, DuPage County, Illinois
 Milton Township, Jefferson County, Indiana
 Milton Township, Butler County, Kansas
 Milton Township, Marion County, Kansas
 Milton Township, Antrim County, Michigan
 Milton Township, Cass County, Michigan
 Milton Township, Dodge County, Minnesota
 Milton Township, Caswell County, North Carolina, in Caswell County, North Carolina
 Milton Township, Ashland County, Ohio
 Milton Township, Jackson County, Ohio
 Milton Township, Mahoning County, Ohio
 Milton Township, Wayne County, Ohio
 Milton Township, Wood County, Ohio

Township name disambiguation pages